The River Alport flows for  in the Dark Peak of the Peak District in Derbyshire, England. The Ashop flows into Ladybower Reservoir about  down the valley, which discharges via the Rivers Derwent and Trent to the North Sea. The source of the Alport is close to the Pennine watershed.

The course of the river includes three small waterfalls. At its southern end lie the remains of a tunnel constructed to carry water to a planned but unbuilt cotton mill. A weir was built on the river in about 1922 and a short watercourse added to feed the water into the Ashop weir located upstream of the confluence. The outlet is visible from the viewing area.

The valley of the Alport contains some farmland, but the banks of the valley are mostly coniferous plantations and heath. The coniferous plantations are being converted to semi-natural deciduous woodland. The small hamlet of Alport lies on the west bank near the southern end of the river.

References

Alport
Alport